The Bourget Congress was the sixteenth national congress of the French Socialist Party (Parti socialiste or PS). It took place from 22 to 24 October 1993. The Refoundation Motion supported by Michel Rocard, Lionel Jospin, and Laurent Fabius won.

Results

Michel Rocard was elected as First Secretary.

References

Congresses of the Socialist Party (France)
1993 in France
1993 in politics
1993 conferences